Townsville railway station is located on the North Coast line in Queensland, Australia. It serves the city of Townsville. The station has one platform. Opposite the platform lies a passing loop. It is also the starting point for the Great Northern line to Mount Isa.

History
The present station opened in May 2003, to replace the Old Townsville railway station in Flinders Street. At this time, rail tracks through the city centre were removed.

Services
Townsville is served by Traveltrain's North Coast Line and Outback Services

 PC94 Spirit of Queensland Service from Roma Street to Cairns
 P987 Spirit of Queensland Service from Cairns to Roma Street
 3M34 Inlander service from Townsville to Mount Isa
 3936 Inlander service from Mount Isa to Townsville

References

External links

Townsville station Queensland's Railways on the Internet

North Queensland
Railway stations in Australia opened in 2003
Regional railway stations in Queensland
North Coast railway line, Queensland
Transport in Townsville